The 2013–14 Indiana Pacers season was 47th season of the franchise and 38th season in the National Basketball Association (NBA). The Pacers marked their best start in franchise history, 16–1.

The Pacers finished the regular season with a win-loss record of 56-26, their best since 2004. It consisted of a home record of 36-5, their best since 2000, and a road record of 21-20. At the end of the season, they were in first place of the division for the second consecutive season and the Eastern Conference for the first time since 2004.

In the playoffs, the Pacers defeated the Atlanta Hawks in seven games in the First Round in a rematch of last season's First Round in which Indiana won in six games, and the Washington Wizards in six games in the Semi-finals to advance to the Conference Finals for the second straight year, only again to be stopped by the two-time defending NBA champion Miami Heat in six games, making it the third straight year that the Pacers had their playoff run ended by the Heat. Miami would go on to lose to a rejuvenated San Antonio Spurs team in a five-game NBA Finals series ending their chances to three-peat.

Key dates
 June 27 – The 2013 NBA draft in New York City.
 July 1 – The free agency period began.
 July 7–12 – The Pacers took part in the 2013 NBA Summer League in Orlando, Florida.
 September 28 – The Pacers began their annual training camp at their practice facility.
 October 5 – The Pacers opened their preseason schedule with an 82–76 loss to the Chicago Bulls.
 October 30 – The Pacers won their regular season opening game at home 97–87 against the Orlando Magic.
 November 22 – The Pacers began their season 11-1, the best season start in franchise history.
 January 24 – Paul George selected as All-Star Game starter.
 January 30 – Roy Hibbert selected as All-Star Reserve.
 February 1 – The Pacers sign Andrew Bynum for rest of the season.
 February 14–16 – The 2014 NBA All-Star Weekend will take place in New Orleans.
 February 20 – Pacers trade Danny Granger to Philadelphia 76ers for Evan Turner and Lavoy Allen
 February 20 – Trade deadline at 3:00 p.m. ET.

2013 NBA draft

* The Pacers traded the draft rights of Iverson to the Boston Celtics for cash.

Roster

Pre-season

|- style="background:#fcc;"
| 1
| October 5
| Chicago
| 
| West & George (14)
| Roy Hibbert (9)
| George Hill (6)
| Bankers Life Fieldhouse15,273
| 0–1
|- style="background:#fcc;"
| 2
| October 10
| Houston
| 
| Paul George (17)
| Roy Hibbert (8)
| George Hill (5)
| Mall of Asia Arena12,885
| 0–2
|- style="background:#fcc;"
| 3
| October 13
| @ Houston
| 
| Paul George (19)
| Danny Granger (9)
| George Hill (4)
| Taipei Arena13,686
| 0–3
|- style="background:#fcc;"
| 4
| October 16
| Dallas
| 
| Scola & Johnson (14)
| Hilton Armstrong (8)
| Donald Sloan (4)
| Bankers Life Fieldhouse12,735
| 0–4
|- style="background:#fcc;"
| 5
| October 18
| @ Chicago
| 
| Paul George (22)
| Hill & Stephenson (7)
| Lance Stephenson (8)
| United Center21,783
| 0–5
|- style="background:#cfc;"
| 6
| October 19
| @ Cleveland
| 
| David West (20)
| Paul George (6)
| George & S. Hill (4)
| Quicken Loans Arena14,760
| 1–5
|- style="background:#cfc;"
| 7
| October 22
| @ Atlanta
| 
| David West (24)
| David West (7)
| Lance Stephenson (8)
| Philips Arena8,263
| 2–5
|- style="background:#cfc;"
| 8
| October 25
| @ Dallas
| 
| Paul George (28)
| Hibbert & Mahinmi (8)
| Paul George (6)
| American Airlines Center19,107
| 3–5

Regular season

Game log

|- style="background:#cfc;"
| 1
| October 29
| Orlando
| 
| Paul George (24)
| Roy Hibbert (16)
| George, Stephenson (5)
| Bankers Life Fieldhouse – 18,165
| 1–0
|- style="background:#cfc;"
| 2
| October 30
| @ New Orleans
| 
| Paul George (32)
| Lance Stephenson (8)
| George, West (5)
| New Orleans Arena – 17,803
| 2–0

|- style="background:#cfc;"
| 3
| November 2
| Cleveland
| 
| Lance Stephenson (22)
| Paul George (13)
| C. J. Watson (6)
| Bankers Life Fieldhouse – 16,242
| 3–0
|- style="background:#cfc;"
| 4
| November 5
| @ Detroit
| 
| Paul George (31)
| George, Hibbert (10)
| Lance Stephenson (7)
| Palace of Auburn Hills – 13,401
| 4–0
|- style="background:#cfc;"
| 5
| November 6
| Chicago
| 
| Paul George (21)
| David West (13)
| Stephenson, Watson, Sloan (4)
| Bankers Life Fieldhouse – 18,165
| 5–0
|- style="background:#cfc;"
| 6
| November 8
| Toronto
| 
| Paul George (23)
| Paul George (8)
| Paul George (6)
| Bankers Life Fieldhouse – 13,316
| 6–0
|- style="background:#cfc;"
| 7
| November 9
| @ Brooklyn
| 
| Paul George (24)
| Roy Hibbert (11)
| Stephenson, Hill (7)
| Barclays Center – 17,732
| 7–0
|- style="background:#cfc;"
| 8
| November 11
| Memphis
| 
| Paul George (23)
| Lance Stephenson (11)
| Lance Stephenson (12)
| Bankers Life Fieldhouse – 13,130
| 8–0
|- style="background:#cfc;"
| 9
| November 15
| Milwaukee
| 
| Roy Hibbert (24)
| Roy Hibbert (10)
| George Hill (5)
| Bankers Life Fieldhouse – 16,202
| 9–0
|- style="background:#fcc;"
| 10
| November 16
| @ Chicago
| 
| Roy Hibbert (14)
| Roy Hibbert (10)
| George Hill (5)
| United Center – 22,158
| 9–1
|- style="background:#cfc;"
| 11
| November 20
| @ New York
| 
| Paul George (35)
| David West (10)
| Lance Stephenson (5)
| Madison Square Garden – 19,812
| 10–1
|- style="background:#cfc;"
| 12
| November 22
| @ Boston
| 
| Paul George (27)
| Lance Stephenson (11)
| Lance Stephenson (10)
| TD Garden – 18,624
| 11–1
|- style="background:#cfc;"
| 13
| November 23
| Philadelphia
| 
| Roy Hibbert (27)
| Roy Hibbert (13)
| David West (6)
| Bankers Life Fieldhouse – 18,165
| 12–1
|- style="background:#cfc;"
| 14
| November 25
| Minnesota
| 
| George, Hill (26)
| George, Stephenson, Scola (8)
| George Hill (7)
| Bankers Life Fieldhouse – 16,426
| 13–1
|- style="background:#cfc;"
| 15
| November 27
| @ Charlotte
| 
| C. J. Watson (18)
| Hibbert, Stephenson (10)
| George, Hill (4)
| Time Warner Cable Arena – 15,170
| 14–1
|- style="background:#cfc;"
| 16
| November 29
| Washington
| 
| Paul George (23)
| Lance Stephenson (11)
| Lance Stephenson (10)
| Bankers Life Fieldhouse – 18,165
| 15–1

|- style="background:#cfc;"
| 17
| December 1
| @ L.A. Clippers
| 
| Paul George (27)
| David West (12)
| Hill, Stephenson (6)
| Staples Center – 19,060
| 16–1
|- style="background:#fcc;"
| 18
| December 2
| @ Portland
| 
| Paul George (43)
| Roy Hibbert (14)
| George Hill (11)
| Moda Center – 19,023
| 16–2
|- style="background:#cfc;"
| 19
| December 4
| @ Utah
| 
| Paul George (19)
| Roy Hibbert (9)
| David West (8)
| EnergySolutions Arena – 15,519
| 17–2
|- style="background:#cfc;"
| 20
| December 7
| @ San Antonio
| 
| Paul George (28)
| Hibbert, Scola (10)
| Paul George (6)
| AT&T Center – 18,581
| 18–2
|- style="background:#fcc;"
| 21
| December 8
| @ Oklahoma City
| 
| Paul George (32)
| Roy Hibbert (9)
| West, Stephenson (3)
| Chesapeake Energy Arena – 18,203
| 18–3
|- style="background:#cfc;"
| 22
| December 10
| Miami
| 
| Roy Hibbert (24)
| David West (9)
| George Hill (6)
| Bankers Life Fieldhouse – 18,165
| 19–3
|- style="background:#cfc;"
| 23
| December 13
| Charlotte
| 
| Lance Stephenson (20)
| Hibbert, Stephenson (11)
| Lance Stephenson (7)
| Bankers Life Fieldhouse – 18,165
| 20–3
|- style="background:#fcc;"
| 24
| December 16
| Detroit
| 
| Lance Stephenson (23)
| Paul George (9)
| Lance Stephenson (6)
| Bankers Life Fieldhouse – 15,443
| 20–4
|- style="background:#fcc;"
| 25
| December 18
| @ Miami
| 
| Paul George (25)
| Lance Stephenson (9)
| Paul George (6)
| American Airlines Arena – 19,898
| 20–5
|- style="background:#cfc;"
| 26
| December 20
| Houston
| 
| Paul George (24)
| Paul George (9)
| Lance Stephenson (6)
| Bankers Life Fieldhouse – 18,165
| 21–5
|- style="background:#cfc;"
| 27
| December 22
| Boston
| 
| Paul George (24)
| Roy Hibbert (12)
| Lance Stephenson (10)
| Bankers Life Fieldhouse – 18,165
| 22–5
|- style="background:#cfc;"
| 28
| December 23
| @ Brooklyn
| 
| George, Stephenson (26)
| Hibbert, Scola (9)
| George, Stephenson (5)
| Barclays Center – 17,732
| 23–5
|- style="background:#cfc;"
| 29
| December 28
| Brooklyn
| 
| Paul George (24)
| Lance Stephenson (9)
| Lance Stephenson (7)
| Bankers Life Fieldhouse – 18,165
| 24–5
|- style="background:#cfc;"
| 30
| December 31
| Cleveland
| 
| Paul George (21)
| Luis Scola (9)
| Lance Stephenson (8)
| Bankers Life Fieldhouse – 18,165
| 25–5

|- style="background:#fcc;"
| 31
| January 1
| @ Toronto
| 
| Roy Hibbert (16)
| Paul George (8)
| Lance Stephenson (4)
| Air Canada Centre – 18,271
| 25–6
|- style="background:#cfc;"
| 32
| January 4
| New Orleans
| 
| Paul George (24)
| Paul George (10)
| West, George (5)
| Bankers Life Fieldhouse – 18,165
| 26–6
|- style="background:#cfc;"
| 33
| January 5
| @ Cleveland
| 
| Paul George (16)
| Luis Scola (8)
| Paul George (6)
| Quicken Loans Arena – 17,502
| 27–6
|- style="background:#cfc;"
| 34
| January 7
| Toronto
| 
| Roy Hibbert (22)
| David West (12)
| Lance Stephenson (8)
| Bankers Life Fieldhouse – 16,147
| 28–6
|- style="background:#fcc;"
| 35
| January 8
| @ Atlanta
| 
| Paul George (28)
| Paul George (12)
| six players (3)
| Philips Arena – 15,169
| 28–7
|- style="background:#cfc;"
| 36
| January 10
| Washington
| 
| David West (20)
| Paul George (14)
| Paul George (6)
| Bankers Life Fieldhouse – 18,165
| 29–7
|- style="background:#cfc;"
| 37
| January 14
| Sacramento
| 
| Paul George (31)
| David West (8)
| Lance Stephenson (5)
| Bankers Life Fieldhouse – 17,530
| 30–7
|- style="background:#cfc;"
| 38
| January 16
| New York
| 
| Lance Stephenson (28)
| Paul George, Luis Scola (7)
| George Hill (5)
| Bankers Life Fieldhouse – 18,165
| 31–7
|- style="background:#cfc;"
| 39
| January 18
| L.A. Clippers
| 
| Paul George (36)
| Lance Stephenson (12)
| Lance Stephenson (7)
| Bankers Life Fieldhouse – 18,165
| 32–7
|- style="background:#cfc;"
| 40
| January 20
| @ Golden State
| 
| Paul George (23)
| Roy Hibbert (13)
| Lance Stephenson (7)
| Oracle Arena – 19,596
| 33–7
|- style="background:#fcc;"
| 41
| January 22
| @ Phoenix
| 
| Paul George (26)
| Paul George (7)
| Lance Stephenson (4)
| US Airways Center – 16,465
| 33–8
|- style="background:#cfc;"
| 42
| January 24
| @ Sacramento
| 
| Paul George (36)
| Roy Hibbert (11)
| George Hill (8)
| Sleep Train Arena – 17,317
| 34–8
|- style="background:#fcc;"
| 43
| January 25
| @ Denver
| 
| Lance Stephenson (23)
| Paul George (11)
| Lance Stephenson (7)
| Pepsi Center – 19,155
| 34–9
|- style="background:#cfc;"
| 44
| January 28
| @ L.A. Lakers
| 
| David West (19)
| Lance Stephenson (14)
| Lance Stephenson, Paul George (6)
| Staples Center – 18,997
| 35–9
|- style="background:#fcc;"
| 45
| January 30
| Phoenix
| 
| Roy Hibbert (26)
| Paul George (12)
| Lance Stephenson (10)
| Bankers Life Fieldhouse – 16,541
| 35–10

|- style="background:#cfc;"
| 46
| February 1
| Brooklyn
| 
| Paul George, Roy Hibbert (20)
| Paul George (8)
| David West (7)
| Bankers Life Fieldhouse – 18,165
| 36–10
|- style="background:#cfc;"
| 47
| February 3
| Orlando
| 
| Danny Granger (16)
| Lance Stephenson (12)
| Lance Stephenson (5)
| Bankers Life Fieldhouse – 16,266
| 37–10
|- style="background:#cfc;"
| 48
| February 4
| @ Atlanta
| 
| David West (22)
| David West (10)
| George Hill (7)
| Philips Arena – 15,374
| 38–10
|- style="background:#cfc;"
| 49
| February 7
| Portland
| 
| George Hill (37)
| David West (10)
| George Hill (8)
| Bankers Life Fieldhouse – 18,165
| 39–10
|- style="background:#fcc;"
| 50
| February 9
| @ Orlando
| 
| Paul George (27)
| Lance Stephenson (9)
| George Hill (7)
| Amway Center – 16,366
| 39–11
|- style="background:#cfc;"
| 51
| February 10
| Denver
| 
| David West (25)
| Roy Hibbert (12)
| George Hill (5)
| Bankers Life Fieldhouse – 16,124
| 40–11
|- style="background:#fcc;"
| 52
| February 12
| Dallas
| 
| George Hill (14)
| Lance Stephenson (10)
| David West (6)
| Bankers Life Fieldhouse – 17,663
| 40–12
|- align="center"
|colspan="9" bgcolor="#bbcaff"|All-Star Break
|- style="background:#cfc;"
| 53
| February 18
| Atlanta
| 
| Paul George (26)
| David West (6)
| Lance Stephenson, George Hill  (7)
| Bankers Life Fieldhouse – 18,165
| 41–12
|- style="background:#fcc;"
| 54
| February 19
| @ Minnesota
| 
| Paul George (35)
| Paul George (11)
| Lance Stephenson (4)
| Target Center – 15,109
| 41–13
|- style="background:#cfc;"
| 55
| February 22
| @ Milwaukee
| 
| Paul George (32)
| Lance Stephenson (9)
| Lance Stephenson (8)
| BMO Harris Bradley Center – 17,165
| 42–13
|- style="background:#cfc;"
| 56
| February 25
| L.A. Lakers
| 
| Paul George (20)
| David West (12)
| Paul George (6)
| Bankers Life Fieldhouse – 18,165
| 43–13
|- style="background:#cfc;"
| 57
| February 27
| Milwaukee
| 
| Roy Hibbert (24)
| Roy Hibbert (12)
| Paul George (6)
| Bankers Life Fieldhouse – 17,892
| 44–13

|- style="background:#cfc;"
| 58
| March 1
| @ Boston
| 
| Paul George (25)
| Lance Stephenson (9)
| Lance Stephenson (6)
| TD Garden18,624
| 45–13
|- style="background:#cfc;"
| 59
| March 2
| Utah
| 
| David West (25)
| Lance Stephenson (8)
| Stephenson & Watson (5)
| Bankers Life Fieldhouse18,165
| 46–13
|- style="background:#fcc;"
| 60
| March 4
| Golden State
| 
| David West (27)
| Paul George (12)
| Paul George (4)
| Bankers Life Fieldhouse18,165
| 46–14
|- style="background:#fcc;"
| 61
| March 5
| @ Charlotte
| 
| Evan Turner (22)
| Lance Stephenson (8)
| Evan Turner (5)
| Time Warner Cable Arena15,372
| 46–15
|- style="background:#fcc;"
| 62
| March 7
| @ Houston
| 
| David West (15)
| David West (10)
| Lance Stephenson (6)
| Toyota Center18,332
| 46–16
|- style="background:#fcc;"
| 63
| March 9
| @ Dallas
| 
| Paul George (27)
| Paul George (11)
| West, Stephenson, Hill & Turner (3)
| American Airlines Center20,361
| 46–17
|- style="background:#cfc;"
| 64
| March 11
| Boston
| 
| David West (24)
| Andrew Bynum (10)
| George, Hill & Sloan (4)
| Bankers Life Fieldhouse18,165
| 47–17
|- style="background:#cfc;"
| 65
| March 14
| @ Philadelphia
| 
| Paul George (25)
| Lance Stephenson (12)
| George Hill (9)
| Wells Fargo Center14,754
| 48–17
|- style="background:#cfc;"
| 66
| March 15
| @ Detroit
| 
| Paul George (30)
| Bynum & Stephenson (9)
| Paul George (7)
| Palace of Auburn Hills17,440
| 49–17
|- style="background:#cfc;"
| 67
| March 17
| Philadelphia
| 
| Lance Stephenson (25)
| David West (12)
| David West, George Hill (3)
| Bankers Life Fieldhouse18,165
| 50–17
|- style="background:#fcc;"
| 68
| March 19
| @ New York
| 
| Lance Stephenson (21)
| Lance Stephenson (9)
| George Hill (4)
| Madison Square Garden19,812
| 50–18
|- style="background:#cfc;"
| 69
| March 21
| Chicago
| 
| Luis Scola (19)
| Paul George (12)
| Paul George (10)
| Bankers Life Fieldhouse18,165
| 51–18
|- style="background:#fcc;"
| 70
| March 22
| @ Memphis
| 
| Lance Stephenson (15)
| Lance Stephenson (8)
| George Hill (5)
| FedExForum18,119
| 51–19
|- style="background:#fcc;"
| 71
| March 24
| @ Chicago
| 
| Paul George (21)
| Lance Stephenson (10)
| Hill & West (4)
| United Center21,803
| 51–20
|- style="background:#cfc;"
| 72
| March 26
| Miami
| 
| Paul George (23)
| David West (9)
| David West (5)
| Bankers Life Fieldhouse18,165
| 52–20
|- style="background:#fcc;"
| 73
| March 28
| @ Washington
| 
| Paul George (19)
| Lance Stephenson (14)
| George Hill (5)
| Verizon Center19,708
| 52-21
|- style="background:#fcc;"
| 74
| March 30
| @ Cleveland
| 
| Paul George (15)
| George, Stephenson & Hill (7)
| George Hill (6)
| Quicken Loans Arena17,147
| 52-22
|- style="background:#fcc;"
| 75
| March 31
| San Antonio
| 
| Paul George (16)
| David West (8)
| Paul George (5)
| Bankers Life Fieldhouse18,165
| 52-23

|- style="background:#cfc;"
| 76
| April 2
| Detroit
| 
| Paul George (27)
| Paul George (13)
| Paul George (7)
| Bankers Life Fieldhouse18,165
| 53-23
|- style="background:#fcc;"
| 77
| April 4
| @ Toronto
| 
| Paul George (26)
| David West (7)
| George Hill (5)
| Air Canada Centre19,800
| 53-24
|- style="background:#fcc;"
| 78
| April 6
| Atlanta
| 
| Paul George (18)
| George & Hill (7)
| David West (6)
| Bankers Life Fieldhouse18,165
| 53-25
|- style="background:#cfc;"
| 79
| April 9
| @ Milwaukee
| 
| Luis Scola (24)
| Luis Scola (9)
| Evan Turner (9)
| BMO Harris Bradley Center13,139
| 54-25
|- style="background:#fcc;"
| 80
| April 11
| @ Miami
| 
| Paul George (22)
| David West (8)
| Paul George (5)
| American Airlines Arena20,300
| 54-26
|- style="background:#cfc;"
| 81
| April 13
| Oklahoma City
| 
| David West (21)
| Paul George (12)
| Lance Stephenson (11)
| Bankers Life Fieldhouse18,165
| 55-26
|- style="background:#cfc;"
| 82
| April 16
| @ Orlando
| 
| Rasual Butler & Chris Copeland (19)
| Lavoy Allen (11)
| Evan Turner (6)
| Amway Center18,846
| 56-26

Playoffs

Game log

|- style="background:#fcc;"
| 1
| April 19
| Atlanta
| 
| Paul George (25)
| Paul George (10)
| Paul George (5)
| Bankers Life Fieldhouse18,165
| 0–1
|- style="background:#cfc;"
| 2
| April 22
| Atlanta
| 
| Paul George (27)
| Paul George (10)
| George & West (6)
| Bankers Life Fieldhouse18,165
| 1–1
|- style="background:#fcc;"
| 3
| April 24
| @ Atlanta
| 
| Lance Stephenson (21)
| Paul George (14)
| David West (5)
| Philips Arena18,124
| 1–2
|- style="background:#cfc;"
| 4
| April 26
| @ Atlanta
| 
| Paul George (24)
| Paul George (10)
| George & Hill (5)
| Philips Arena19,043
| 2–2
|- style="background:#fcc;"
| 5
| April 28
| Atlanta
| 
| Paul George (26)
| Paul George (12)
| David West (7)
| Bankers Life Fieldhouse18,165
| 2–3
|- style="background:#cfc;"
| 6
| May 1
| @ Atlanta
| 
| George & West (24)
| David West (11)
| David West (6)
| Philips Arena19,044
| 3–3
|- style="background:#cfc;"
| 7
| May 3
| Atlanta
| 
| Paul George (30)
| Lance Stephenson (14)
| Lance Stephenson (5)
| Bankers Life Fieldhouse18,165
| 4–3

|- style="background:#fcc;"
| 1
| May 5
| Washington
| 
| George & Hill (18)
| David West (12)
| Paul George (5)
| Bankers Life Fieldhouse18,165
| 0–1
|- style="background:#cfc;"
| 2
| May 7
| Washington
| 
| Roy Hibbert (28)
| Roy Hibbert (9)
| Lance Stephenson (5)
| Bankers Life Fieldhouse18,165
| 1–1
|- style="background:#cfc;"
| 3
| May 9
| @ Washington
| 
| Paul George (23)
| Paul George (8)
| Hill & Stephenson (5)
| Verizon Center20,356
| 2–1
|- style="background:#cfc;"
| 4
| May 11
| @ Washington
|  
| Paul George (39)
| Paul George (12)
| David West (8)
| Verizon Center20,356
| 3–1
|- style="background:#fcc;"
| 5
| May 13
| Washington
| 
| David West (17)
| David West (6)
| Turner, Stephenson, Hibbert & West (3)
| Bankers Life Fieldhouse18,165
| 3–2
|- style="background:#cfc;"
| 6
| May 15
| @ Washington
| 
| David West (29)
| Roy Hibbert (7)
| Lance Stephenson (8)
| Verizon Center19,502
| 4–2

|- style="background:#cfc;"
| 1
| May 18
| Miami
| 
| Paul George (24)
| Roy Hibbert (9)
| Lance Stephenson (8)
| Bankers Life Fieldhouse18,165
| 1–0
|- style="background:#fcc;"
| 2
| May 20
| Miami
| 
| Lance Stephenson (25)
| Roy Hibbert (13)
| Lance Stephenson (7)
| Bankers Life Fieldhouse18,165
| 1–1
|- style="background:#fcc;"
| 3
| May 24
| @ Miami
| 
| Paul George (17)
| Lance Stephenson (11)
| Lance Stephenson (5)
| American Airlines Arena20,025
| 1–2
|- style="background:#fcc;"
| 4
| May 26
| @ Miami
| 
| Paul George (23)
| David West (12)
| West, Stephenson & Hill (4)
| American Airlines Arena19,874
| 1–3
|- style="background:#cfc;"
| 5
| May 28
| Miami
| 
| Paul George (37)
| Roy Hibbert (13)
| Lance Stephenson (5)
| Bankers Life Fieldhouse18,165
| 2–3
|- style="background:#fcc;"
| 6
| May 30
| @ Miami
| 
| Paul George (29)
| Paul George (8)
| Hibbert, Hill & Sloan (3)
| American Airlines Arena20,021
| 2–4

Standings

Player statistics

Regular season

Playoffs

Player Statistics Citation:

See also

References

Indiana Pacers seasons
Indiana Pacers
Pace
Pace